Dvoynovsky is a rural locality (a khutor) and the administrative center of Dvoynovskoye Rural Settlement, Novonikolayevsky District, Volgograd Oblast, Russia. The population was 813 as of 2010. There are 16 streets.

Geography 
Dvoynovsky is located in steppe, on the Khopyorsko-Buzulukskaya Plain, 13 km northeast of Novonikolayevsky (the district's administrative centre) by road. Orlovsky is the nearest rural locality.

References 

Rural localities in Novonikolayevsky District